Brainerd is a station on Metra's Rock Island District line in the Washington Heights community area of Chicago, Illinois. The address is 8901 South Loomis Boulevard, but the station is actually in the middle of 89th Street from Loomis Boulevard to Bishop Street,  from LaSalle Street Station, the northern terminus of the Rock Island District. In Metra's zone-based fare system, Brainerd is within zone C. As of 2018, Brainerd is the 151st busiest of Metra's 236 non-downtown stations, with an average of 265 weekday boardings. It consists of two side platforms that serve two tracks. A shelter is available, but there is no ticket agent. Parking is available along the station on 89th Street.

As of 2022, Brainerd is served by 20 trains in each direction on weekdays, by 10 inbound trains and 11 outbound trains on Saturdays, and by eight trains in each direction on Sundays.

References

External links

Station from Loomis Street from Google Maps Street View
Station House from Google Maps Street View

Brainerd (Metra)
Railway stations in the United States opened in 1999